The 2010 CFL Draft took place on Sunday, May 2, 2010 at 12:00 PM ET on TSN. 47 players were chosen from among eligible players from Canadian universities across the country, as well as Canadian players playing in the NCAA. After a number of trades, including ones made on draft day, Toronto and BC wound up with the most picks with nine apiece. The defending Grey Cup champions, the Montreal Alouettes, had seven, while the Calgary Stampeders had six. The Edmonton Eskimos, Hamilton Tiger-Cats, Winnipeg Blue Bombers and the Saskatchewan Roughriders each had four. Of the 47 draft selections, 36 players were drafted from Canadian Interuniversity Sport institutions.

The Saskatchewan Roughriders also had the option to increase their number of draft picks as part of the three-way trade that was completed with Winnipeg and Hamilton in April, 2009. The Roughriders could have either swapped first round picks with Winnipeg in this year's draft or in the 2011 CFL Draft, or receive two second round picks in 2011 and 2012. This was done due to the uncertainty of the Stefan LeFors trade where the traded draft pick to Edmonton was conditional upon Lefors' performance. It was then confirmed that the Roughriders had chosen to swap first round picks with the Blue Bombers in this year's draft.

Top prospects 
Source: CFL Scouting Bureau final rankings.

Forfeitures
 Hamilton forfeited their first round selection after selecting Zac Carlson in the 2009 Supplemental Draft.

Draft order

Round one

Round two

Round three

Round four

Round five

Round six

References 

Canadian College Draft
Cfl Draft, 2010